Pusia granum is a species of sea snail, a marine gastropod mollusk, in the family Costellariidae, the ribbed miters.

References

 osta, O.G. (1844) Catalogo de'testacei viventi del piccolo e grande mare di Taranto redatto sul sistema di Lamarck. Atti Reale Accademia di Scienze in Napoli, 5, 13–66, 4 pls
 Gofas, S.; Le Renard, J.; Bouchet, P. (2001). Mollusca, in: Costello, M.J. et al. (Ed.) (2001). European register of marine species: a check-list of the marine species in Europe and a bibliography of guides to their identification. Collection Patrimoines Naturels, 50: pp. 180–213
 Turner H. 2001. Katalog der Familie Costellariidae Macdonald, 1860. Conchbooks. 1–100 page(s): 35

External links
 Forbes E. (1844). Report on the Mollusca and Radiata of the Aegean sea, and on their distribution, considered as bearing on geology. Reports of the British Association for the Advancement of Science for 1843. 130-193
  Danilo, F. & Sandri, G. B. (1856). Elenco nominale dei gasteropodi testacei marini raccolti nei dintorni di Zara. pp. 107-150, In: Programma dell'I.R. ginnasio completo di prima classe: in Zara alla fine dell'anno scolastico 1855-1856. Zara, Tipografia Governiale
 Brusina, S. (1865). Conchiglie dalmate inedite. Verhandlungen der Kaiserlich-königlichen Zoologisch-botanisch Gesellschaft in Wien. 15: 3-42

granum